Felix Vogg (born 19 June 1990) is a Swiss Olympic eventing rider. He competed at the 2016 Summer Olympics in Rio de Janeiro and at the 2020 Summer Olympics in Tokyo.

Vogg also participated 2014 and 2018 at the World Equestrian Games. 2013, 2017, 2019 and 2021 he competed at the European Eventing Championships. 

In 2012 he won the FEI World Cup Eventing title, with his horses Maverick MacNamara and Onfire. At the age of 22, he became the youngest winner of the FEI World Cup Eventing series in history.

His grandfather Roland Perret competed at the 1956 Summer Olympics, while his brother Ben Vogg also competed at the 2016 Olympics.

At the 2019 Pau CCI***** event, Vogg's partner Archie Rocks suffered a catastrophic shoulder fracture on his approach to a fence late in the cross country course. The decision to euthanize the horse was made by the owners and the show veterinarians after it became clear that the injury was irreparable.

CCI 5* Results

International Championship Results

References

Living people
1990 births
Swiss male equestrians
Equestrians at the 2016 Summer Olympics
Olympic equestrians of Switzerland
Equestrians at the 2020 Summer Olympics
21st-century Swiss people